Yuki Masuda (born 1973) is a female voice actor born in Atami.

Yuki Masuda may also refer to:

 Yuki Matsuda (speed skater) (born 1987), Chinese speed skater
 Yūki Masuda (born 1979), male voice actor from Tokyo
 Yuuki Matsuda, voice actor from Tokyo, real name Takehiro Matsuda
 Yuki Matsuda Singer born in 1987. Daughter of actor Yusaku Matsuda and actress Miyuki Matsuda